Colin Morris (born 22 August 1953) is an English former footballer who played as an attacking midfielder.
 
Morris started his career with Burnley as an apprentice. He made his debut for Burnley in their home FA Cup defeat to non-league Wimbledon in January 1975. After six years at Turf Moor he joined Southend United. Another move took him to Blackpool, where he was the club's top League scorer in 1980–81 with twelve goals. A £100,000 transfer saw him join Sheffield United in February 1982.

His son, Lee, followed him into the Blades ranks in the 1990s.

Notes

External links
League stats at Neil Brown's site

1953 births
Living people
People from Blyth, Northumberland
English footballers
Association football midfielders
Burnley F.C. players
Southend United F.C. players
Blackpool F.C. players
Sheffield United F.C. players
Scarborough F.C. players
Boston United F.C. players
English Football League players
Scarborough F.C. managers
English Football League managers
Footballers from Northumberland
English football managers